Jan Tomáš Kuzník (1716, Uhřičice – 13 April 1786, Kojetín) was a Czech teacher of music, musician, composer and poet. He was active in the Haná region.

Life
Kuzník was born in Uhřičice near Přerov. In 1739–1764 he worked in Napajedla as a music teacher and organist. Most of his works comes from this period. He composed church and lay music whose texts concentrate on misery of peasantry and Prussian Wars (he wrote the texts himself). Some of his easier works, composed in Haydn style, are played until today.

His son, Jan Karel Kuzník, was a collector of traditional folk songs and author of humoristic "map of Haná".

References
 Music journal "Hudební Věda" (Musical Science, published by Czech Academy of Sciences) , No 32, Vol 3 (1995): p 298-313

1716 births
1786 deaths
Czech composers
Czech male composers
People from Přerov District